The 2021 Sochi Formula 2 round  the sixth round of the 2021 Formula 2 Championship and took place at the Sochi Autodrom from 24 to 25 September. It ran in support of the 2021 Russian Grand Prix and was planned to feature three races. However, the second sprint race was cancelled amid bad weather conditions. This is the first cancelled Formula 2 race since the cancellation of the feature race during the 2019 Spa-Francorchamps FIA Formula 2 round due to Anthoine Hubert's fatal accident.

Classification

Qualifying

Sprint race 1

Sprint race 2 
The second sprint race was cancelled due to heavy rainfall, which led to postponement of the first races of Formula 2 and Formula 3.

Feature Race

Standings after the event 

Drivers' Championship standings

Teams' Championship standings

 Note: Only the top five positions are included for both sets of standings.

See also 
2021 Russian Grand Prix
2021 Sochi Formula 3 round

References

External links 

 

Sochi
Sochi Formula 2
Sochi Formula 2